Chernavka is a rural locality (a village) in Puzevskoye Rural Settlement, Buturlinovsky District, Voronezh Oblast, Russia. The population was 347 as of 2010. There are 5 streets.

Geography 
Chernavka is located 30 km southwest of Buturlinovka (the district's administrative centre) by road. Puzevo is the nearest rural locality.

References 

Rural localities in Buturlinovsky District